We Want the Colonels is a 1973 Italian comedy film directed by Mario Monicelli. It was entered in the 1973 Cannes Film Festival. It is a satire of the attempted far-right Borghese Coup.

Cast
 Ugo Tognazzi as Giuseppe Tritoni
 Tino Bianchi as On. Mazzante
 Claude Dauphin as President of Italy
 Duilio Del Prete as Mons. Giampaolino Sartorello
 Antonino Faà di Bruno as Col. Vittorio Emanuele Ribaud
 Vincenzo Falanga as Ciccio Introna
 Gian Carlo Fusco as Col. Gavino Furas
 Barbara Herrera as Amelia D'Amatrice
 Giuseppe Maffioli as Col. Pino Barbacane
 Renzo Marignano as Ten. Branzino
 Camillo Milli as Col. Elpidio Aguzzo
 François Périer as On. Di Cori
 Lino Puglisi as On. Salvato Li Masi
 Gianni Solaro as On. Cicero
 Carla Tatò as Marcella Bassi Lega
 Pietro Tordi as Gen. Bassi Lega
 Stavros Tornes
 Max Turilli as Col. Quintiliano Turzilli
 Pino Zac as Armando Caffè

References

External links

1973 films
1973 comedy films
1970s Italian-language films
Italian satirical films
Commedia all'italiana
Films set in Rome
Films directed by Mario Monicelli
Films scored by Carlo Rustichelli
Political fiction
Films about terrorism
Films with screenplays by Age & Scarpelli
1970s political comedy films
Films about coups d'état
1970s Italian films